‌The 2022 South and Central American Women's Handball Championship was the third edition of the championship and held from 15 to 19 November 2022 at Buenos Aires, Argentina under the aegis of South and Central America Handball Confederation. It was the first time in history that the championship is organised by the Argentinean Handball Confederation and also acted as the qualification tournament for the 2023 World Women's Handball Championship, with the top two teams qualifying.

Brazil won their third title.

Qualified teams

Standings

Results
All times are local (UTC−3).

Team champion roster

References

External links

South and Central American Women's Handball Championship
South and Central American Women's Handball Championship
South and Central American Women's Handball Championship
South
November 2022 sports events in Argentina
2022